Flat Rock Reservoir is located by Lower Oswegatchie, in St. Lawrence County, New York. Fish species present in the lake are largemouth bass, smallmouth bass, walleye, landlocked salmon, brown trout, white sucker, sunfish, rock bass, yellow perch, and black bullhead. There is a hard surface ramp launch access on county route 3.

References

Lakes of St. Lawrence County, New York
Lakes of New York (state)